Christopher George Hollins (born July 8, 1986) is an American attorney and politician who served as interim Harris County Clerk from June 2020 to November 2020. He is known for overseeing the 2020 United States presidential election in Harris County; many of his policies received resistance from state Republican officials.

A member of the Democratic Party, Hollins has served as Vice Chair of the Texas Democratic Party and worked as an intern in the Obama Administration. In February 2022, he announced his candidacy in the 2023 Houston mayoral election.

Early life and career 
Christopher George Hollins was born on July 8, 1986 and is a 4th-generation Houstonian. His father worked for the Houston Police Department. Growing up in Missouri City, Texas, he graduated from Hightower High School.  Hollins then attended Morehouse College where he received a Bachelor of Arts in political science.  Following graduation, Hollins went on to earn a Juris Doctor from Yale Law School, and an Master of Business Administration from Harvard Business School.

Hollins is an attorney.  His early professional experience includes positions with Goldman Sachs and McKinsey & Company where he operated as a management consultant.

Interim Clerk for Harris County 
On May 16, 2020, the Commissioners Court for Harris County voted to appoint Hollins as Interim Clerk for Harris County, Texas by a 3-2, party-line vote after his predecessor, Diane Trautman, resigned from the position citing ill health.  At 33 years old, Hollins was the youngest person to have ever held the position, as well as the first African American. He took office on June 1, 2020.

The Office of the Harris County Clerk is not only responsible for administering permits and other licenses or incorporation documents, but also responsible for managing all election responsibilities as the Harris County Elections Administrator. Hollins submitted a plan to separate the responsibilities of overseeing the election from the Office of the Harris County Clerk into a new, separate appointed position:  Harris County Elections Administrator. His efforts resulted in Isabel Longoria, a community organizer and special adviser to Hollins, being sworn in to the office via virtual ceremony on November 18, 2020. Longoria was the first to hold the position.

Hollins tenure as clerk ended on November 17, 2020, and he was succeeded by newly elected Teneshia Hudspeth. Both during and following his tenure as Clerk, Hollins made both national and local news appearances, including but not limited to KTRK-TV (ABC); Ayman; and Zerlina.

2020 U.S. presidential election and Texas voting restrictions

Hollins was vocal in opposing Texas governor Greg Abbott's decision to allow only one drop-box per Texas county in the 2020 presidential election.

Hollins sought to send out applications for postal (mail-in) ballots for the general election to each registered voter to Harris County. However, this plan was challenged by Republican officials, and was blocked by the Supreme Court of Texas in October 2020. Other policies instituted by Hollins include expansion of in-person voting locations, the introduction of drive-through voting, developing COVID-19 safety guidelines regarding voting, extending voting hours to include 24-hour voting.

On November 1, 2020, days before election day, the Supreme Court of Texas threw out a Republican challenge seeking to invalidate about 127,000 votes cast via the drive-through voting program Hollins implemented. Two days later, a federal judge upheld the legitimacy of drive-through votes, rejecting a similar Republican effort to invalidate votes case through this method.

On September 7, 2021, Governor Abbott responded to the voting modifications Hollins put in place during his tenure as Clerk by signing a voting bill that tightened state election laws by limiting the ability to expand voting options at the county level. The voting bill was scheduled to take effect just in time for the 2022 primary elections, but has since been stuck in federal court.

In November 2020, Hollins appeared on various national and local news programs to discuss the Harris County elections, including MSNBC.

Other political activities 
In 2009, Hollins was a summer intern during the presidency of Barack Obama.  As a White House intern, Hollins worked in the Office of Presidential Personnel which oversees the selection process for presidential appointments.

After his tenure as County Clerk, Hollins was appointed to sit on the Board of Directors of the Metropolitan Transit Authority of Harris County.

Hollins is the Vice Chair of the Texas Democratic Party.

Houston mayoral candidacy
In February 2022, Hollins announced his candidacy in the 2023 Houston mayoral election to succeed Sylvester Turner, who's term-limited. In the first five months of his candidacy, Hollins raised $1.1 million.

References

Further reading

External links 
 Official campaign website

Place of birth missing (living people)
Living people
People from Harris County, Texas
Texas Democrats
African-American people in Texas politics
County officials in Texas
Morehouse College alumni
Yale Law School alumni
Harvard Business School alumni
21st-century African-American people
1986 births